All Saints University, whose complete name is All Saints University Lango (ASUL), is a private university in Uganda. It is recognised as a university by the Uganda National Council for Higher Education (UNCHE).

Location
The coordinates of the university campus are 2°14'46.0"N, 32°53'59.0"E (Latitude:2.246111; Longitude:32.899722).

History
ASUL was founded in 2008 by the Diocese of Lango of the Church of Uganda. Although the founders and administrators of the university are Christians, the university admits students without regard to nationality, religious beliefs, or ethnicity. The first class of 90 undergraduate students was admitted in January 2009. The courses taught at the university are accredited by UNCHE.

Recent developments
In April 2014, Vice Chancellor Fred Opio Ekong died from injuries sustained during an automobile accident.

Academics
, ASUL maintained three faculties:
 Faculty of Business Administration and Management
 Faculty of Social Science
 Faculty of Education

Courses
The following degree courses are offered at ASUL:

Faculty of Business Administration and Management
 Bachelor of Business Administration and Management
 Bachelor of Entrepreneurship and Small Business Management

Faculty of Education
 Bachelor of Primary Education
 Bachelor of Secondary Education

Faculty of Social Sciences
 Bachelor of Arts in social sciences
 Bachelor of Social Work and Social Administration
 Bachelor of Arts in Project Planning and Management

In addition to the degree courses, the university offers many diploma and certificate courses in the same or related fields.

See also
List of universities in Uganda
Education in Uganda
List of Ugandan university leaders

References

External links
 All Saints University Homepage

Universities and colleges in Uganda
Educational institutions established in 2008
Lira District
Lango sub-region
Northern Region, Uganda
2008 establishments in Uganda